Azul Lizeth Almazán López (born 24 October 1981) is a Mexican diver. She competed in three events at the 2000 Summer Olympics.

References

External links
 

1981 births
Living people
Mexican female divers
Olympic divers of Mexico
Divers at the 2000 Summer Olympics
Place of birth missing (living people)